Corinne Schädler (born 26 August 1992) is a Swiss beauty pageant titleholder who was crowned as Miss Earth Switzerland 2015 and Switzerland's representative in Miss Earth 2015

Pageantry

Miss Earth Switzerland 2015
Corrine was one of the eleven candidates for Miss Earth Switzerland 2015. The finals night was held at Umweltarena. At the end of the pageant, Corrine was declared as Miss Earth Switzerland 2015. Gaby Fondja, Dona Shatrolli and Irmela Sabotic are declared as runners up. Miss Earth Switzerland 2014 Shayade Hug crowned Corrine at the end of the event.

Miss Earth 2015
Winning Miss Earth Switzerland for 2015, Corinne is Switzerland's representative to be Miss Earth 2015 and would try to succeed Jamie Herrell as the next Miss Earth.

References

Miss Earth 2015 contestants
Swiss beauty pageant winners
Living people
1992 births